Rübezahl's Wedding (German: Rübezahls Hochzeit) is a 1916 German silent fantasy drama film directed by Rochus Gliese and Paul Wegener and starring Wegener, Lyda Salmonova, and Georg Jacoby. It was the first in a trilogy of fairytale films made by Wegener also including Hans Trutz in the Land of Plenty and The Pied Piper of Hamelin.

It was shot at the Tempelhof Studios in Berlin and on location in a variety of settings, including mountain shots in the Riesengebirge and a farm near Dresden. The film's sets were designed by Gliese.

Cast
In alphabetical order
Arthur Ehrens as Count
Rochus Gliese as hairdresser 
Hedwig Gutzeit as Buschgrossmutter 
Georg Jacoby as inspector 
Emilie Kurz as Gouvernante 
Marianne Niemeyer as grandmother
Lyda Salmonova as Elfe 
Ernst Waldow as tutor 
Paul Wegener as Rübezahl

See also
Rübezahl

References

External links

Films of the German Empire
German silent feature films
Films directed by Paul Wegener
Films directed by Rochus Gliese
German fantasy drama films
1910s fantasy drama films
Films shot at Tempelhof Studios
Films based on fairy tales
German black-and-white films
1916 drama films
Silent fantasy drama films
1910s German films